Private Division is an American video game publisher based in New York City. The brainchild of Take-Two Interactive's Michael Worosz, the subsidiary was founded by Worosz and Allen Murray, and officially announced on December 14, 2017. Private Division is Take-Two Interactive's third publishing label, following Rockstar Games and 2K. Private Division funds and publishes indie games developed by small to mid-sized studios. This includes taking over Kerbal Space Program, which was developed by Squad and previously acquired by Take-Two Interactive, as well as publishing titles from Obsidian Entertainment, Panache Digital Games, and V1 Interactive.

In addition to offices within Take-Two's headquarters in New York City, Private Division also has offices in Seattle, Las Vegas and Munich.

History 
Take-Two's prior publishing model has been focused on its two internally-owned labels, Rockstar Games which is used for its action-adventure games like Grand Theft Auto, and its 2K label that includes 2K Games and 2K Sports for other games. All such games are developed principally through internal development studios or from large third-party triple-A studios (such as Firaxis Games with Civilization IV or Gearbox Software for the Borderlands series).

Take-Two formed Private Division as a new publishing label to help smaller and independent studios. The label looks to provide funding and publishing for "triple-I" games such as Ninja Theory's Hellblade: Senua’s Sacrifice, those that fell into the middle ground between triple-A games by large studios, and indie games created by relatively new and small indie studios.  The formation of Private Division was led by Take-Two's head of corporate development and independent publishing Michael Worosz. Worosz, in evaluating potential games to publish under Take-Two's name, found a number of mid-sized studios founded by developers that had prior triple-A development experience but wanted to create less ambitious games. Worosz learned that these studios struggled with funding, as they did not fit into the types of studios backed by indie game publishers like Devolver Digital, and their projects were too large to be backed through self-funding or crowdfunding. About two and a half years prior to the label's announcement Worosz pitched the idea of Private Division to Take-Two's CEO Strauss Zelnick, who greenlit the creation of the label and they hired Allen Murray in late 2015 to run the production side, begin recruiting developers and build their team and infrastructure. The label aids in the development process and works with the developer to create project timelines and milestones, and will help the publish and distribute the games when completed, but does not seek to own the intellectual property of the developers.

With the label's formation on December 14, 2017, Take-Two announced four games already in the works to be published under the label: The Outer Worlds from Obsidian Entertainment, Darkborn (originally as working title Project Wight) from The Outsiders, Disintegration from V1 Interactive, and Ancestors: The Humankind Odyssey from Panache Digital Games. Additionally, Kerbal Space Program, acquired earlier by Take-Two, will be re-published under the Private Division label. In the case of Darkborn, some time in 2018, Private Division and The Outsiders decided to go separate ways, with Private Division stating that they continued to support The Outsiders for several months after the termination of the contract.

In February 2020, Take-Two established a yet-named studio within Private Division located at Seattle for development of Kerbal Space Program 2, later named Intercept Games, with several of Star Theory Games staff, including Jeremy Ables and Nate Simpson, joining the new studio.

Private Division announced publishing deals with Moon Studios, League of Geeks and Roll7 for yet-unannounced games in July 2020. Later, in November 2021, Private Division acquired Roll7.

In March 2022, Private Division announced publishing deals with four more studios: Die Gute Fabrik, Evening Star, Piccolo Studio and Yellow Brick Games.

In August 2022, Private Division announced a partnership with Wētā Workshop to publish a game in the Middle-Earth franchise. As of the announcement, the game is in early stages of development and is expected to release in early 2024.

In December 2022, Private Division announced a publishing deal with Bloober Team to release a new survival horror game.

Games published

Notes

References

External links 
 

American companies established in 2017
Indie video games
Take-Two Interactive divisions and subsidiaries
Video game companies established in 2017
Video game companies of the United States
Video game publishers
Companies based in New York City
2017 establishments in New York City